Baltoji Vokė (formerly known in Lithuanian as Naujoji Žagarinė;) is a city in Šalčininkai District Municipality, Vilnius County, Lithuania.

In 2011, the city had a population of 1101. Most of its inhabitants were Poles - 58,13% (640), followed by Lithuanians – 23,71% (261), Russians - 11,26% (124) and Belarusians - 3,45% (38).

References

Cities in Lithuania
Cities in Vilnius County
Šalčininkai District Municipality